The thirteenth season of Let's Dance started on February 21, 2020, and ended on May 22, 2020, on RTL. Daniel Hartwich and Victoria Swarovski returned as hosts. Joachim Llambi, Motsi Mabuse and Jorge Gonzalez returned as the judges.

Dancing Stars 2020 were Lili Paul-Roncalli & Massimo Sinato.

Due to the COVID-19 epidemic in Germany, in week 3 on Friday 13 March 2020 in the studio were only family and Friends and beginning with week 4 on Friday 20 March 2020 and continuing indefinitely, all live shows aired without the audience in the studio. In the final were family and Friends in the studio, also the couples that were already eliminated were there.

Couples
On January 15, 2020, RTL announced the 14 Let's Dance-celebrities to be participating in the series and on February 6, 2020, were announced the Let's Dance-professional partners. At the end of the Launch show were announced the 14 couples.

Scoring chart

Red numbers indicates the lowest score for each week.
Green numbers indicates the highest score for each week.
 indicates the couple eliminated that week.
 indicates the returning couple that finished in the bottom two.
 indicates the couple which was immune from elimination.
 indicates the couple that didn't perform due to personal reasons.
 indicates the couple that withdrew from the competition.
 indicates the couple was eliminated but later returned to the competition.
 indicates the winning couple.
 indicates the runner-up couple.
 indicates the third-place couple.

Averages 
This table only counts for dances scored on a traditional 30-points scale.

Highest and lowest scoring performances 
The best and worst performances in each dance according to the judges' marks are as follows:

Couples' highest and lowest scoring dances
According to the traditional 30-point scale.

Weekly scores and songs

Launch show
For the fourth time, there was a launch show in which each celebrity meets their partner. This show aired on 21 February 2020. In this first live show the couples danced in groups and each couple was awarded points by the judges and the viewers. At the end of the show the couple with the highest combined points was  granted immunity from the first elimination in the following week.

 Opening dance of the professional dancers: "Let Me Entertain You" - Robbie Williams/"Shake Your Body (Down to the Ground)" - The Jackson 5/"Pégate" - Ricky Martin
 Special guest: Dancing Star 2019, Pascal Hens und Ekaterina Leonova: Salsa, "Valió la Pena" - Marc Anthony

Key
 Celebrity won immunity from the first elimination

The Team dances

Week 1
 Opening dance of the professional dancers: "In the Air Tonight" - Phil Collins/"Higher Love" - Kygo & Whitney Houston

Running order

Week 2
 Opening dance of the professional dancers: "Insomnia" - Faithless/"Halo" - Beyoncé

Running order

Week 3
Theme: 70's
 For the first time in the history of the show only family and friends were present in the studio.
 Opening dance of the professional dancers: "I Will Survive"-Gloria Gaynor/"Everybody Dance"-Chic
Running order

Week 4
 John didn't perform this week due to an illness in his family.
 For the first time in the history of the show, the dancers performed without a live audience. This continued for the rest of the season.
Running order

Week 5
Theme: 90's
 John Kelly had to withdraw from the show due to an illness in his family. Loiza Lamers returned after being eliminated.
 Christian Polanc didn't dance this week because he was ill. Laura Müller danced with Robert Beitsch instead.
Running order

Week 6
Theme: Love Week
Running order

Week 7
 The show aired on April 17 because of the Easter holidays.
Musical guests: Ramon Roselly - "Eine Nacht"
Running order

Week 8
Thema: TV-Melodien
Running order

Week 9
Thema: Magic Moments
Running order

Week 10
 Due to the COVID-19 pandemic in Germany there was no trio challenge. This year each couple was instead assigned a prop for the second dance.
Thema: Challenge dances
Running order

Week 11: Semi-final
 Thema: Impro Dance Even More Extreme
Running order

Week 12: Final
Theme: 'Judges' Choice, Favorite dance & Freestyle'''
Musical guests: Pietro Lombardi - "Kämpferherz"
Running order

Dance chart
 Highest scoring dance
 Lowest scoring dance
 Was not scored (encore performance in the finale)
 The pair did not perform this week

References

External links
Official website

Let's Dance (German TV series)
2020 German television seasons